Khoshk-e Rudbar (also Romanized as Khoshk-e Rūdbār) is a village in Ziabar Rural District, in the Central District of Sowme'eh Sara County, Gilan Province, Iran. At the 2006 census, its population was 419, in 108 families.

References 

Populated places in Sowme'eh Sara County